Mary Theresa O'Connor (born 19 June 1955 in Hokitika, West Coast) is a retired long-distance runner from New Zealand. She competed for her native country at the 1984 Summer Olympics in Los Angeles, California. There she ended up in 27th place in the women's marathon. O'Connor set her personal best in the classic distance (2:28.20) in 1983.

Achievements

External links
 
 

1955 births
Living people
New Zealand female long-distance runners
Olympic athletes of New Zealand
Athletes (track and field) at the 1984 Summer Olympics